The Guitar is a 2008 American drama film directed and co-produced by Amy Redford. It stars Saffron Burrows as a woman who decides to pursue her dreams after being diagnosed with a terminal disease, fired from her job and abandoned by her boyfriend.

Plot
One morning, "mouse-burger" Melody "Mel" Wilder is diagnosed with laryngeal cancer, then fired from her thankless job and abandoned by her boyfriend. With nothing left to lose, and given only two months to live, she spends her entire life's savings to rent a palatial loft in Greenwich Village. Thinking she'll never have to pay the landlord, she lives off her credit cards, and fills the loft with high-priced products. She seduces both the parcel-delivery man and a pizza delivery girl and teaches herself to play the electric guitar she's romanticized since childhood. These life affirming experiences transform her irrevocably, as she discovers a passion for life and the will to live.

Reception
, The Guitar holds a 33% approval rating on Rotten Tomatoes, based on 18 reviews with an average rating of 4.62/10.

Cast
 Saffron Burrows as Melody Wilder
 Isaach De Bankolé as Roscoe Wasz
 Paz de la Huerta as Constance 'Cookie' Clemente
 Mia Kucan as Young Mel
 Adam Trese as Mr. Laffs
 Janeane Garofalo as Dr. Murray
 Elizabeth Marvel as Ma Wilder
 Bill Camp as Pa Wilder
 William Leroy as Billy

References

External links

2008 films
2008 drama films
2008 independent films
American drama films
Films about cancer
American independent films
Films about guitars and guitarists
Films scored by David Mansfield
2000s English-language films
2000s American films
2008 directorial debut films